Below is listed the winners and the runners-up in the 1999 and 1994 parliamentary elections in Nepal.

Bagmati Zone

Bhaktapur District

Dhading District

Kathmandu District

Kavrepalanchowk District

Lalitpur District

Nuwakot District

Rasuwa District

Sindhupalchowk District

Bheri Zone

Banke District

Bardia District

Dailekh District

Jajarkot District

Surkhet District

Dhawalagiri Zone

Baglung District

Mustang District

Myagdi District

Parbut District

Gandaki Zone

Gorkha District

Kaski District

Lamjung District

Manang District

Shyanja District

Tanahu District

Janakpur Zone

Dhanusha District

Dolakha District

Mahottari District

Ramechap District

Sarlahi District

Sindhuli District

Karnali Zone

Dolpa District

Humla District

Jumla District

Kalikot District

Mugu District

Koshi Zone

Bhojpur District

Dhankuta District

Morang District

 Source:

Sankhuwasabha District

Sunsari District

Terhathum District

Lumbini Zone

Argakhanchi District

Gulmi District

Kapilbastu District

Nawalparasi District

Palpa District

Rupandehi District

Mahakali Zone

Baitadi District

Dadeldhura District

Darchula

Kanchanpur District

Mechi Zone

Ilam District

Jhapa District

Panchthar District

Taplejung District

Narayani Zone

Bara District

Chitwan District

Makwanpur District

Parsa District

Rautahat District

Rapti Zone

Dang District

Pyuthan District

Rolpa District

Rukum District

Salyan District

Sagarmatha Zone

Khotang District

Saptari District

Siraha District

Okhaldhunga

Udaypur District

Seti Zone

Accham

Bahjang

Barjura District

Doti

Kailali

Sources
Election Commission of Nepal

Elections in Nepal
1994 in Nepal
1999 in Nepal